Gunfighter II: Revenge of Jesse James is a light gun shooter video game developed by Rebellion Developments and published by Ubi Soft for the PlayStation 2. It is the sequel to the 2001 game Gunfighter: The Legend of Jesse James. It is compatible with the GunCon 2 controller (G-Con 2 in Europe). The game's plot is set in the American Old West. The game's protagonist is Jesse James, an American outlaw who lived in the 19th century.

Gameplay
Gameplay is very similar to the original installment. The player takes control of the main character's weapon in a first-person perspective. While the computer controls the character's movement, the player should take out all of the enemies in a limited time.

References

2003 video games
Europe-exclusive video games
PlayStation 2 games
PlayStation 2-only games
Ubisoft games
Western (genre) video games
Light gun games
Rebellion Developments games
Video games developed in the United Kingdom